This article shows the rosters of all participating teams at the 2021 Asian Men's Volleyball Championship in Japan.

Pool A

()
The following is the team roster for the 2021 Asian Men's Volleyball Championship.

Head Coach:  Yuichi Nakagaichi

Head coach:

Head coach:

Head coach:

Pool B

The following is the Iranian roster in the 2021 Asian Men's Volleyball Championship.

Head coach:  Behrouz Ataei

The following is the Pakistani roster in the 2021 Asian Men's Volleyball Championship.

Head Coach: Rahman Mohammadirad

Head coach:

Head Coach:

Pool C

Head coach:

Head coach:

Head coach:

Head coach:

Pool D

Head coach:  Park Sam-ryong

Head coach:

Head coach:

Head coach:

References

External links
Squads

2021 Asian Men's Volleyball Championship